The Jazz Tour was the sixth headlining concert tour by the British rock band Queen, supporting the album Jazz. The tour was memorable for the spectacle created by the band. As James Henke of Rolling Stone said about the band's Halloween 1978 concert in New Orleans: "...when they were launching a U.S. tour in support of their Jazz, album, Queen threw a bash in New Orleans that featured snake charmers, strippers, crossdressers and a naked fat lady who smoked cigarettes in her crotch." Part of the European leg was recorded for the band's first live album, Live Killers.

Background
Due to the tour starting within weeks of the final recording sessions for Jazz, Freddie Mercury's voice is worn out from the start, and while he does have moments of excellence, his performances are generally below-average when compared to the previous tour. While holding up fine for the American and European shows, he loses his voice in Japan, leading to some of his worst performances. In contrast, the band's musicianship is creative and very inspired. When "We Will Rock You" was performed, there would be a person dressed in a Superman costume holding up Mercury on their shoulders while he sings.

Setlists

Average setlist
This setlist is representative of the performance on 16 December 1978 in Oakland, United States. It does not represent all the setlists for the duration of the tour.
"We Will Rock You (Fast)"
"Let Me Entertain You"
"Somebody To Love"
"If You Can't Beat Them"
"Death on Two Legs"
"Killer Queen"
"Bicycle Race"
"I'm In Love With My Car"
"Get Down, Make Love"
"You're My Best Friend"
"Now I'm Here"
"Spread Your Wings"
"Dreamer's Ball"
"Love Of My Life"
"'39"
"It's Late"
"Brighton Rock"
"Fat Bottomed Girls"
"Keep Yourself Alive"
"Bohemian Rhapsody"
"Tie Your Mother Down"Encore
"Sheer Heart Attack"Encore
"We Will Rock You"
"We Are The Champions"
"God Save The Queen"

Selected setlists

Tour dates

Box office score data

Tour band
Freddie Mercury: Lead vocals, piano, tambourine.
Brian May: Guitar, backing vocals, piano ("Teo Torriatte")
Roger Taylor: Drums, timpani, lead vocals ("I'm in Love With My Car"), backing vocals.
John Deacon: Bass guitar, additional backing vocals, triangle

References

External links
Queen Concerts

Queen (band) concert tours
1978 concert tours